Gorana is a village in Bar Municipality in Montenegro. The village is located southeast from the town of Bar in the region of Mrkojevići. Gorana has a population of 523 inhabitants according to the 2003 census.
 
Gorana is a rural farmland that has an elementary school since around year 1905. For further education children of Gorana will have to attend school in Pečurice.

Demographics
Gorana is a sub-region of the Mrkojevići ethno-geographical region and communal municipality of Bar. As of 2011, the demographic composition of the communal municipality is as follows:

References

Populated places in Bar Municipality